Fraser Stott (born 13 August 1969 in Cambuslang, Scotland) is a former Scottish rugby union player and coach who played for Glasgow Warriors at the  Scrum-half position.

Rugby Union career

Amateur career

Starting out as an amateur player he played for Cambuslang RFC until 1988 when he moved to West of Scotland.

Later rejecting a full-time contract with the Warriors but still playing for Glasgow, Stott then played for East Kilbride RFC in 2000. He was made club captain in season 2001–02.

Provincial and professional career

He was picked for the amateur Glasgow District team.

On professionalism in Scotland in 1996 he was then signed as a professional contract for the Glasgow Warriors team. As the scrum half named for Warriors first match as a professional team - against Newbridge in the European Challenge Cup - Stott has the distinction of being given Glasgow Warrior No. 9 for the provincial side.

He played with Glasgow till 2001 in spite of having a knee operation in 2000. He made 14 appearances in the Heineken Cup and 2 appearances in the European Rugby Challenge Cup for Glasgow.

International career

He has represented Scotland A. He was also picked to play for the Barbarians.

Coaching career

In the 2002-03 season he was made Assistant Coach for East Kilbride under Craig Redpath. The 2003–04 season he was made Head Coach though he still played. John Shaw was made Assistant Coach / Player. Stott was to remain with the club as player-coach until he retired in 2011. He was the supporter's player of the year for season 2010–11.

He now works as a rugby development officer for South Lanarkshire Leisure and Culture.

External links
 Statbunker profile
 European Stats

References

1969 births
Living people
Barbarian F.C. players
Cambuslang RFC players
East Kilbride RFC players
Glasgow District (rugby union) players
Glasgow Warriors players
Rugby union players from Cambuslang
Scotland 'A' international rugby union players
Scottish rugby union players
West of Scotland FC players
Rugby union scrum-halves